John Glélé (born 19 February 1986) is a former professional footballer who played as a left-back. Born in France, he represented the Benin national team internationally, making two appearances in 2009.

Club career 
Glélé began his career with EA Guingamp B and was in 2005 transferred to Amiens SC B. He left the club in 2007, playing the first half of the 2007–08 season for Cowdenbeath F.C. and the second half for ASM Belfort. On 30 January 2008, he signed a contract with Cypriot First Division team APEP Pitsilia.

International career 
On 11 February 2009, Glélé made his debut for the Benin national team in a friendly against Algeria.

References

External links 
 

1988 births
Living people
Citizens of Benin through descent
French sportspeople of Beninese descent
Beninese footballers
French footballers
Association football fullbacks
Benin international footballers
Cypriot First Division players
Cypriot Second Division players
En Avant Guingamp players
Amiens SC players
Cowdenbeath F.C. players
APEP FC players
ASM Belfort players
Beninese expatriate footballers
Beninese expatriate sportspeople in France
Expatriate footballers in France
Beninese expatriate sportspeople in Scotland
Expatriate footballers in Scotland
Beninese expatriate sportspeople in Cyprus
Expatriate footballers in Cyprus
Expatriate footballers in Switzerland
Black French sportspeople